Omias is a genus of broad-nosed weevils in the beetle family Curculionidae. There are more than 50 described species in Omias.

Species
These 56 species belong to the genus Omias:

 Omias alboornatus (Reitter, 1894)
 Omias albus Van Dyke, 1935
 Omias angelovi Borovec, 2015
 Omias armatus (Seidlitz, 1868)
 Omias atticus (Pic, 1902)
 Omias behnei Borovec, 2015
 Omias borysthenicus Korotyaev, 1992
 Omias brancsiki (Reitter, 1906)
 Omias bulgaricus (Purkyne, 1949)
 Omias chelmosensis (Meschnigg, 1939)
 Omias compactus (Angelov, 1973)
 Omias crassirostris Borovec, 2015
 Omias crinitoides (Angelov, 1973)
 Omias cylindrirostris (Angelov, 1973)
 Omias daghestanicus (Iablokov-Khnzorian, 1980)
 Omias erectus Hatch, 1971
 Omias focarilei (Pesarini, 1972)
 Omias formaneki (Reitter, 1906)
 Omias ganglbaueri Formánek, 1908
 Omias globulus (Boheman, 1843)
 Omias glomeratus Schoenherr, 1826
 Omias haematopus Rosenhauer, 1856
 Omias helleri (Reitter, 1906)
 Omias indutus Kiesenwetter, 1864
 Omias inermis (Solari, 1926)
 Omias interruptopunctatus Ménétriés, 1849
 Omias krueperi (Stierlin, 1888)
 Omias macedonicus (Meschnigg, 1939)
 Omias matejkai (Purkyne, 1949)
 Omias microsetosus Białooki, 2015
 Omias minor Hatch, 1971
 Omias moczarski (Angelov, 1973)
 Omias montanus (Angelov, 1973)
 Omias moreanus (Meschnigg, 1939)
 Omias murinus (Boheman, 1843)
 Omias oertzeni Stierlin, 1887
 Omias ossae (Purkyne, 1949)
 Omias pseudomurinus Borovec, 2015
 Omias puberulus Boheman, 1834
 Omias pustulatus (Seidlitz, 1868)
 Omias rilensis Borovec, 2015
 Omias saccatus (LeConte, 1857) (sagebrush weevil)
 Omias sandneri (Reitter, 1906)
 Omias scabripennis Ménétriés, 1849
 Omias scrobithorax Borovec, 2015
 Omias seidlitzi (Kraatz, 1888)
 Omias seminulum (Fabricius, 1792)
 Omias similis (Meschnigg, 1939)
 Omias sparsus Hatch, 1971
 Omias squamulatus Borovec, 1998
 Omias striatus Hatch, 1971
 Omias taygetanos (Purkyne, 1949)
 Omias turcicus (Seidlitz, 1868)
 Omias turkestanicus (Schilsky, 1912)
 Omias verruca Boheman, 1834
 Omias winkelmanni Borovec & Bahr, 2012

References

Further reading

 
 
 
 

Entiminae
Articles created by Qbugbot